Joceline Claude Lega is a French physicist and applied mathematician, interested in nonlinear dynamics. She is a professor in the departments of mathematics, applied mathematics, and epidemiology and biostatistics at the University of Arizona,
and editor-in-chief of Physica D.

Education and career
After studying physics at the École Normale Supérieure in Paris from 1984 to 1988,
and earning licentiate and maîtrise degrees in physics through Pierre and Marie Curie University in 1985, Lega earned a diplôme d'études approfondies in 1986 and a doctorate in theoretical physics in 1989, both at the University of Nice Sophia Antipolis. Her dissertation was Topological defects associated with the breaking of time translation invariance.

She joined the Centre national de la recherche scientifique (CNRS) in 1989, and took a leave from CNRS to join the University of Arizona in 1997.
At Arizona, she was the director of the Program in Integrated Science (from 2008 to 2011), and the Institute for Mathematics & Education (from 2009 to 2013). Since 2016 she is the associate head for the Postdoctoral Program in Mathematics.

Recognition
Lega became a Fellow of the Institute of Physics in 2004.
In 2017 she was elected as a Fellow of the American Association for the Advancement of Science.

Selected publications

References

External links
Home page

Living people
21st-century American mathematicians
21st-century American physicists
French mathematicians
French physicists
American women mathematicians
French women physicists
University of Arizona faculty
Fellows of the American Association for the Advancement of Science
Fellows of the Institute of Physics
Year of birth missing (living people)
Place of birth missing (living people)
French National Centre for Scientific Research scientists
École Normale Supérieure alumni
University of Paris alumni
Academic journal editors
French expatriates in the United States
21st-century women mathematicians
21st-century American women